Asterix the Gaul (French: Astérix le Gaulois) is a 1967 Belgian/French animated film, the first in a franchise, based on the comic book of the same name, which was the first book in the highly popular comic series Asterix by René Goscinny and Albert Uderzo. The film closely follows the book's plot.

The film was originally planned to be aired on French television, but instead it was released as a theatrical feature film. It was produced by Dargaud, publisher of the Asterix comics, without the involvement of Albert Uderzo and René Goscinny. Goscinny and Uderzo were not satisfied with the film, and managed to block the release of the planned sequel, Asterix and the Golden Sickle (likewise made without their involvement). Afterwards, they ensured that they would be consulted for all subsequent cartoon adaptations, starting with Asterix and Cleopatra, The film was animated by Belvision and Halas and Batchelor.

Plot
After a brief introduction to the principal characters, the film follows Asterix as he is ambushed by a group of Roman legionaries in the forest. Despite being significantly outnumbered, Asterix leaves the Romans beaten and bruised. Their state upon their return to camp prompts the leader Phonus Balonus to seek the secret behind the Gauls' superhuman strength. Phonus selects a volunteer (by means of a single round of musical chairs) to pose as a Gaul in order to infiltrate the village; the unlucky loser is a short, slack-tongued misfit named Caligula Minus. He is dressed in a wig, false moustache and traditional Gaulish dress and led in chains through the forest as a prisoner, awaiting rescue by the Gauls. Sure enough, Asterix and Obelix free Minus and believe his flimsy cover story that he is a Gaul from Lutetia.

Once inside the Gaulish village, Minus goads Asterix into sharing the secret of the magic potion with him; he goes on to use the same tactic against Getafix in order to try the potion for himself. Before he has a chance to steal some of the potion to take back to the Roman camp, Minus' cover is accidentally blown during a traditional dance; Asterix pulls off Minus' moustache. Still empowered by the magic potion, Minus makes good his escape, with the Gauls powerless to stop him.

Minus is debriefed by Phonus Balonus, who on learning of the magic potion orders his legionaries to capture Getafix and bring him back to the camp. Getafix is later ambushed by the Romans while he is out collecting mistletoe, but refuses to divulge any of the secrets of the magic potion to Phonus. When Getafix fails to return to the village, Asterix goes into the forest to look for him where he encounters a slow-witted merchant with a dilemma over his oxen. After benefiting from Asterix's common sense the merchant agrees to take him to the Roman camp on his cart, hidden in a pile of hay until nightfall. Having infiltrated the camp, Asterix hears Phonus plotting with his Decurion Marcus Sourpuss to overthrow Caesar. Asterix locates Getafix and forms a plan to free him. He seemingly surrenders and convinces the Romans that he and Getafix will co-operate at the prospect of being tortured; Getafix is then escorted by legionnaires as he collects the required ingredients for the potion in the forest. Unable to locate strawberries (since they are not in season), Getafix orders the Romans to search far and wide for them. When an exhausted legionnaire returns with a basket of them from Greece, the Gauls proceed to eat them all and request that some more be obtained. This drives Phonus to despair; Getafix quickly relents and prepares the potion without strawberries.

Believing that the potion Getafix has made is the same as that which gives the Gauls their strength, the Romans drink it and discover, much to their dismay, that it is in fact a hair-growing formula. The entire legion is soon at the mercy of Getafix as their hair and beards grow out of control, rendering them practically helpless. Getafix claims that he can reverse the effects of the first potion by making another, knowing that the effects will wear off soon anyway; with the Romans distracted he collects the ingredients for the real magic potion, which he makes just for Asterix, and an "antidote", in reality just vegetable soup. Just as the pair begin to overpower their captors, Phonus receives a surprise visit from Julius Caesar who – dismayed by the state in which he finds the camp – asks to meet the Gauls. Asterix reveals that Phonus planned to use the potion to overthrow Caesar, who relieves Phonus of his duties and awards Asterix and Getafix their freedom, though he tells them that they will meet again.

Asterix and Getafix return to the village where Obelix spots them coming. The whole village celebrates with a huge banquet.

Cast

Additional Voices
 Pierre Tornade (Merchant)
 Jacques Jouanneau (Cacofonix, Caligula Minus)
 Pierre Trabaud
 Robert Vattier
 Michel Puterflam
 Bernard Lavalette
 Maurice Chevit
 Georges Carmier
 Henri Labussiere (uncredited)

No credits exist for this film in English. As most of the recurring characters sound identical in Asterix and Cleopatra, it can be reasonably assumed that the same cast was used in both films, though, at present, only a few roles can be credited.

Production and release
 In the English version of the film, many of the characters' names are inconsistent with those used in the rest of the series and books. Getafix kept his original French name Panoramix, Vitalstatistix is named Tonabrix and the bard Cacofonix is named Stopthemusix. The name changes were attributed to the film being dubbed in English before the books were translated, although the names of the characters are correct in the intro titles.  This has however been changed for re-releases, where the titles reflect the names as spoken in the film.
 In the scene where Caligula Minus is drinking the magic potion, Getafix seems to be tall, and someone is wearing the same clothes as Asterix.
 In the film, Caesar has black hair instead of white.
 The film was re-released in West Germany in 1984. This version featured new dialogue because the original German version in 1971 was missing dialogue. Besides the new dialogue (with new actors replacing the dialogue made by different actors in 1971) the 1984 version also included a newly composed electronic music soundtrack by Klaus Zuball and Hans Cies.

Reception 
In the United Kingdom, the film was watched by 500,000 viewers on television in 2004, making it the year's third most-watched European-language film on television.

References

External links
 AsterixNZ entry
 

1967 films
Belgian animated films
1960s French-language films
French animated films
1967 animated films
Asterix films
Belgian children's films
French children's films
Animated films based on comics
Depictions of Julius Caesar on film
Films scored by Gérard Calvi
1960s French animated films
Films directed by Ray Goossens
1960s children's animated films